Beautiful Young Minds was a documentary first shown at the BRITDOC Festival on 26 July 2007 and first broadcast on BBC 2 on 14 October 2007. The documentary follows the selection process and training for the U.K. team to compete in the 2006 International Mathematical Olympiad (IMO), as well as the actual event in Slovenia. Many of the young mathematicians featured in the film had a form of autism, which the documentary links to mathematical ability. The team goes on to win numerous medals at the IMO, including four silver and one bronze. It was directed by Morgan Matthews, edited by Joby Gee and featured music by Sam Hooper. It was also screened at the Bath Film Festival in October 2007. The documentary inspired the 2014 film X+Y, which was also directed by Morgan Matthews, based on IMO participant Daniel Lightwing.

Awards

References

External links
IMDb.com: Beautiful Young Minds
Plus Magazine: Beautiful young minds

2007 television specials
BBC television documentaries
English-language television shows
International Mathematical Olympiad